The Great Sand Sea is an approximately  sand desert (erg) in the Sahara between western Egypt and eastern Libya in North Africa. Most of the area is covered by sand dunes.

Geography
On satellite images this desert shows a pattern of long sand ridges running in a roughly north-south direction. However, despite the apparent uniformity the Great Sand Sea has two large areas with different types of megadunes. The Egyptian sand sea lies parallel to the Calanshio Sand Sea of Libya, with which it is contiguous in the north. The dunes of the Great Sand Sea cover about 10% of the total area of the Egyptian Western Desert.

Although well-known to the Tuareg and traders who traveled with caravans across the Sahara, Friedrich Gerhard Rohlfs was the first European to document the Great Sand Sea. He began his Saharan expeditions in 1865, and named the great expanse of dunes the Große Sandmeer (Great Sand Sea), but it was not until 1924 with the maps of Ahmed Hassanein that the full scope of the Great Sand Sea was appreciated by Europeans.

In popular culture
 In the 2017 Ubisoft game Assassin's Creed Origins, the Great Sand Sea is featured as one of the nomes, or regions.

See also

References

External links

Egypt Travel - The Great Sand Sea
Desert Geomorphology
The Great Sand Sea - Rough Guides

Deserts of Egypt
Deserts of Libya
Dunes of Egypt
Ergs of Africa
Western Desert (Egypt)